A Woman's Way may refer to:

 "A Woman's Way" (song), a 1969 song by Andy Williams
 A Woman's Way (1908 film), an American silent short drama film
 A Woman's Way (1916 film), a film produced by World Film
 A Woman's Way (1928 film), an American silent drama film

See also
 Women's Way, a U.S. nonprofit organization